was a Japanese chemist who was the Morris Loeb Professor of Chemistry at Harvard University. He was known for his contributions to the sciences of organic synthesis and total synthesis.

Early life and education
Kishi was born in Nagoya, Japan and attended Nagoya University, where he obtained both his BS and PhD degrees.  He was a postdoctoral research fellow at Harvard University where he worked with Robert Burns Woodward. From 1966 through 1974, he was a professor of chemistry at Nagoya University. Since 1974, Kishi had been a professor of chemistry at Harvard University.

Kishi's research has focused on the total synthesis of complex natural products. The accomplishments of his research group include the total syntheses of palytoxin, mycolactones,  halichondrins, saxitoxin, tetrodotoxin, geldanamycin, batrachotoxin and many others. Kishi has also contributed to the development of new chemical reactions including the Nozaki–Hiyama–Kishi reaction.

Recognition
1999 Imperial Prize of the Japan Academy
2001 Tetrahedron Prize for Creativity in Organic Chemistry & BioMedicinal Chemistry 
2001 Ernest Guenther Award
2001 Person of Cultural Merit
2013 Order of the Sacred Treasure
2018 Ryoji Noyori Prize

See also
Hitoshi Nozaki

References

1937 births
2023 deaths
21st-century American chemists
Japanese chemists
Nagoya University alumni
Academic staff of Nagoya University
Harvard University faculty
Fellows of the American Academy of Arts and Sciences
Persons of Cultural Merit
People from Nagoya